Vandenberg Space Force Base Launch Facility 09 (LC-09) is a US Air Force Intercontinental ballistic missile launch facility on Vandenberg SFB, California, USA.  It is a launch site for the land-based Minuteman missile series.

References

Vandenberg Space Force Base